Emma Lake is an unincorporated place in the Canadian province of Saskatchewan.

Geography  
Emma Lake is in north-central Saskatchewan within the District of Lakeland No. 521. It shares the southern shore of Emma Lake with the communities of Sunnyside Beach to the west and Neis Beach to the east.

Attractions 
Emma Lake is a recreational community with access to beaches, campgrounds, and resorts. It is also near Great Blue Heron Provincial Park. Emma Lake Golf Course is an 18-hole, par-71 course with a total of 5,787 yards, a pro shop, and a licensed restaurant.

Transportation 
Access to the community is from Highway 263.

See also 
List of communities in Saskatchewan
Emma Lake Artist's Workshops

References 

Lakeland No. 521, Saskatchewan
Unincorporated communities in Saskatchewan
Division No. 15, Saskatchewan